Barbro is a female given name in Scandinavia, with the same origin as Barbara

In a village in Dalecarlia, Barbro is also an "estate name", a unisex concept not taken into account in the Swedish name law, which leads to a lot of confusion.

Noted bearers of the name include:
Barbro Alving (1909–1987), Swedish journalist and writer
Barbro Feltzing (born 1945), Swedish Green Party politician, member of the Riksdag 1994–2002
Barbro Hietala Nordlund (born 1946), Swedish social democratic politician, member of the Riksdag 1994–1998 and 2001–2006
Barbro Hiort af Ornäs (1921–2015), Swedish film actress
Barbro Holmberg (born 1952), Swedish Social Democratic politician
Barbro Kollberg (1917–2014), Swedish film actress
Babben Larsson (born 1956), Swedish actress and comedian
Barbro Lönnkvist (born 1959), Swedish orienteering competitor
Barbro Lindgren (born 1937), Swedish children's books writer
Barbro Martinsson (born 1935), Swedish cross-country skier
Barbro Nilsson (1899–1983), Swedish textile artist
Barbro Oborg (born 1941), Swedish actress
Barbro Owens-Kirkpatrick (born 1946), American diplomat
Barbro Sachs-Osher (born 1940), Swedish diplomat
Barbro Westerholm (born 1933), Swedish politician

References

Norwegian feminine given names
Swedish feminine given names